David de Freitas or simply David (born March 13, 1986 in Rio de Janeiro), is a Brazilian striker. He currently plays for Ipatinga on loan from Cruzeiro.

Contract
Ipatinga (Loan) 1 August 2007 to 24 March 2008
Cruzeiro 26 March 2007 to 25 March 2008

External links
 CBF

1986 births
Living people
Brazilian footballers
Cruzeiro Esporte Clube players
Ipatinga Futebol Clube players
Association football forwards
Footballers from Rio de Janeiro (city)